Huangbei Subdistrict  is a subdistrict of the Luohu, Shenzhen, Guangdong, China.

See also
List of township-level divisions of Guangdong
Huangbeiling, a former village in the subdistrict

References

Subdistricts of Shenzhen
Luohu District